Joanne Ryan may refer to:

 Joanne Ryan (camogie), camogie player
 Joanne Ryan (EastEnders), fictional character
 Joanne Ryan (politician) (born 1961), member for the Division of Lalor